A brougham (pronounced , , , or ) was originally a car body style where the driver sat outside and passengers seated within an enclosed cabin, as per the earlier brougham horse-drawn carriage. Similar in style to the later town car, the brougham style was used on chauffeur-driven petrol and electric cars.

In later years, several manufacturers (mostly in the United States) have used the term brougham as a model name or trim level on cars where the driver is in the cabin with the passengers (i.e. cars that do not use the brougham body style).

Early broughams

As a car body style, a brougham was initially a vehicle similar to a limousine but with an outside seat in front for the chauffeur and an enclosed cabin behind for the passengers. As such, it was a version of the town car but, in strict use of the term, with the sharply squared rear end of the roof and the forward-curving body line at the base of the front of the passenger enclosure that were characteristic of the nineteenth century brougham carriage on which the car style was based.

Later broughams:

Electric cars 

In the late nineteenth century and early twentieth century, the brougham body style with an outside chauffeur was popular with electric cars. At that time, there were more than 200 manufacturers of these cars in the United States. In the United States during the first two decades of the twentieth century, the front of the body and the chauffeur were often deleted from the design, with controls placed inside for the owner to operate the vehicle. Despite the resulting coupé style, the result was still called a "brougham", causing the term to be applied to a two-door closed vehicle similar to a coupé, especially one electrically driven.

"Brougham" as a model name or trim level

Cadillac was the first to use the name "Brougham" on a vehicle that did not use the Brougham body style for the 1916 Cadillac Brougham, a large 7-seat sedan. Since then, the name has also been used as a model name by many manufacturers (see below) for sedans and sometimes convertibles, despite the latter not conforming to the original body style in any way.

From the 1970s to the 1990s, "Brougham" was used as a trim level by General Motors, Ford Motor Company, and the Chrysler Corporation.  The name has generally been used for the upper trim level of a particular model.

Examples of model name usage 
 Cadillac
Cadillac Brougham
Cadillac Fleetwood Brougham
Cadillac Eldorado Brougham
Cadillac Sixty Special Brougham
 Oldsmobile
Oldsmobile Ninety-Eight Regency Brougham
Oldsmobile 88 Royale Brougham
Oldsmobile Cutlass Supreme Brougham
Oldsmobile Toronado Brougham
Pontiac
Pontiac Parisienne Brougham
Pontiac Bonneville Brougham
Pontiac Grand Prix Brougham
 Chevrolet
Chevrolet Caprice Classic Brougham
 Ford
Ford LTD Brougham
Ford Torino Brougham
 Mercury
Mercury Montego Brougham
Mercury Marquis Brougham
Mercury Park Lane Brougham
 Nissan
Nissan Cedric Brougham
Nissan Gloria Brougham
 Chrysler
Chrysler New Yorker Brougham
 Dodge
Dodge Monaco Brougham
 Plymouth
Plymouth Valiant Brougham
 American Motors
AMC Ambassador Brougham
 Holden
 Holden Brougham

See also
Landaulet – the opposite, with a covered driver's area and a convertible passenger compartment

References

Car body styles